E. R. Sahadevan was a Tamil veteran villain actor. He acted as the villain along with M. G. Ramachandran, Sivaji Ganesan, Gemini Ganesan, S. S. Rajendran in the 1940s, 1950s and 1960s. He made his debut film Rajasekaran Emantha Sonagiri, released in 1937.

Acted in Thiruvilayadal film released 1965

Career 
In his early days he acted in many stage plays, then started to act in feature films. His first film was Rajasekaran. Starting in the 1940s he acted in villain roles and supporting roles. His notable movies were 1000 Thalai Vaangi Apoorva Chinthamani, Malaikkallan, Gulebakavali, Mayabazar, Kathavarayan, Pudumaipithan, and Thillana Mohanambal.

Filmography

References

External links 
 

20th-century Indian male actors
Indian male film actors
Male actors in Tamil cinema